Chlidonoptera vexillum is a species of praying mantis in the family Hymenopodidae.

See also
List of mantis genera and species

References

External links
 Key to Family Hymenopodidae

Chlidonoptera
Insects described in 1892